Julius Arthur Hemphill (January 24, 1938 – April 2, 1995) was a jazz composer and saxophone player. He performed mainly on alto saxophone, less often on soprano and tenor saxophones and flute.

Biography

Hemphill was born in Fort Worth, Texas, and attended I.M. Terrell High School (as did Ornette Coleman). He studied the clarinet with John Carter, another I.M. Terrell alumnus, before learning saxophone. Gerry Mulligan was an early influence. He studied music at North Texas State College.

Hemphill joined the United States Army in 1964, and served for several years in the United States Army Band. He later performed with Ike Turner for a brief period. In 1968, Hemphill moved to St. Louis, Missouri, and co-founded the Black Artists' Group (BAG), a multidisciplinary arts collective that brought him into contact with artists such as saxophonists Oliver Lake and Hamiet Bluiett, trumpeters Baikida Carroll and Floyd LeFlore, and writer/director Malinke Robert Elliott.

Hemphill moved to New York City in the mid-1970s, and was active in the then-thriving free jazz community. He gave saxophone lessons to a number of musicians, including David Sanborn and Tim Berne. Hemphill was probably best known as the founder of the World Saxophone Quartet, a group he formed in 1976, after collaborating with Anthony Braxton in several saxophone-only ensembles. Hemphill left the World Saxophone Quartet in the early 1990s, and formed a saxophone quintet.

Hemphill recorded over twenty albums as a leader, about ten records with the World Saxophone Quartet and recorded or performed with Björk, Bill Frisell, Anthony Braxton and others. Late in his life, ill-health (including diabetes and heart surgery) forced Hemphill to stop playing saxophone, but he continued writing music until his death in New York City. His saxophone sextet, led by Marty Ehrlich, also released several albums of Hemphill's music, but without Hemphill playing. The most recent is entitled The Hard Blues, recorded live in Lisbon after Hemphill's death from diabetes.

A source of information on Hemphill's life and music is a multi-hour oral history interview that he conducted for the Smithsonian Institution in March and April 1994, and which is held at the Archives Center of the National Museum of American History in Washington, D.C.

Discography

As leader 
 Dogon A.D. (Mbari, 1972)
 Coon Bid'ness (Arista/Freedom, 1975)
 Blue Boye (Mbari, 1977) (Reissued by Screwgun in 1999)
 Roi Boye & the Gotham Minstrels (Sackville, 1977)
 Raw Materials and Residuals (Black Saint, 1978)
 Live in New York (Red Record, 1978)
 Flat-Out Jump Suite (Black Saint, 1980)
 Georgia Blue (Minor Music, 1984)
 Julius Hemphill Big Band (Elektra Musician, 1988)
 Fat Man and the Hard Blues (Black Saint, 1991)
 Live from the New Music Cafe (Music & Arts, 1992)
 Oakland Duets (Music & Arts, 1992) with Abdul Wadud
 Five Chord Stud (Black Saint, 1993)
 Reflections (Freedom, 1995)
 Chile New York (Black Saint, 1998) (Recorded 1980)
 Live at Kassiopeia (NoBusiness, 2011) (Recorded 1987) with Peter Kowald

With World Saxophone Quartet
 Point of No Return (Moers Music, 1977)
 Steppin' with the World Saxophone Quartet (Black Saint, 1979)
 W.S.Q. (Black Saint, 1981)
 Revue (Black Saint, 1982)
 Live in Zurich  (Black Saint, 1984)
 Live at Brooklyn Academy of Music (Black Saint, 1986)
 Plays Duke Ellington (Nonesuch, 1986)
 Dances and Ballads (Elektra Nonesuch, 1987)
 Rhythm and Blues  (Elektra Musician, 1989)

As sideman

 Lightnin' Rod, Hustlers Convention (United Artists, 1973)
 Lester Bowie, Fast Last! (Muse, 1974)
 Anthony Braxton, New York, Fall 1974 (Arista, 1975)
 Oliver Lake, Julius Hemphill, Buster Bee (Sackville, 1978)
 Charles "Bobo" Shaw, Concere Ntasiah (Universal Justice, 1978)
 Charles "Bobo" Shaw, Streets of St. Louis (Moers Music, 1978)
 Kalaparush, Ram's Run (Cadence, 1982)
 Baikida Carroll, Shadows and Reflections (Soul Note, 1982)
 Jamaaladeen Tacuma, Show Stopper (Gramavision, 1983)
 Jean-Paul Bourelly, Jungle Cowboy (JMT, 1987)
 Bill Frisell, Before We Were Born (Elektra Musician, 1989)
 Allen Lowe, At the Moment of Impact (Fairhaven, 1990)
 Allen Lowe, New Tango 92: After Astor Piazzolla (Fairhaven, 1991)
 Peter Kowald, Duos America (FMP, 1991)
 Peter Kowald, Duos: Europa America Japan (FMP, 1991)

References

Further reading

External links 
 Biography in Handbook of Texas
Biography and recordings of his works from the Isabella Stewart Gardner Museum
 
Smithsonian Institution Jazz Oral History Program Collection
 Tim Berne discusses Hemphill: Screwgun Records

1938 births
1995 deaths
American jazz composers
American male jazz composers
American jazz saxophonists
American male saxophonists
Avant-garde jazz musicians
Bessie Award winners
Deaths from diabetes
Elektra Records artists
Freedom Records artists
Music of St. Louis
People from Fort Worth, Texas
Tzadik Records artists
World Saxophone Quartet members
20th-century American composers
20th-century American saxophonists
Jazz musicians from Texas
20th-century American male musicians
Human Arts Ensemble members
Clean Feed Records artists
Music & Arts artists
20th-century jazz composers
NoBusiness Records artists